Mark G. Papa (born 1946/1947) is an American businessman. He is the founder and former chairman and CEO of EOG Resources. On August 1, 2019, he became non-executive chairman of Schlumberger.

Biography

Early life
Papa graduated from the University of Pittsburgh, where he received a bachelor's degree in Petroleum Engineering in 1968. He went on to receive a master's degree in Business Administration from the University of Houston.

Career
He started his career at the Belco Petroleum Corporation in 1981. In 1999, he founded EOG Resources, an oil and gas company headquartered in Houston, Texas. He served as its chairman and chief executive officer, and currently serves on its board of directors. Additionally, he serves on the board of directors of Oil States International.

He has served as the chairman of the United States Oil and Gas Association.

Political life
He has supported Republican candidates.

References

External links
 Centennial Resource Development, Inc.
 Centennial Resource Development, Inc. IPO

1940s births
Living people
Swanson School of Engineering alumni
University of Houston alumni
American chief executives of Fortune 500 companies
Schlumberger people